is a Japanese manga series written and illustrated by Lynn Okamoto. It has been serialized in Kodansha's Weekly Young Magazine magazine since March 2017.

In North America, the manga has been licensed for an English language release by Seven Seas Entertainment in August 2019.

Plot
Youta Tada is an ordinary high school student who holds deep feelings for his childhood friend. One day during class, he is suddenly attacked and seemingly killed by a mysterious scarecrow-like being. Youta then wakes up and finds himself in an alternate world with castles, dragons and two colored moons in a purple sky. Here he meets paladin girl Lumi and a three-legged bird named Genius and quickly learns that he got into a women-only world where he is the first man that appeared in centuries. Thanks to that, women in this world have absolutely no resistance towards him and his single touch makes Lumi incredibly aroused. Genius then orders him to mate with her and all other girls in this fantastical world.

Characters

An ordinary high school student who holds deep feelings for his childhood friend. He is pretty skilled in kendo, which he learned on a suggestion of his father.

A paladin of the Caesar Kingdom. She is not very smart, but very kind and after their first encounter, she helps Youta to hide his identity before others. She is a member of The Quintet group that protects the city of Meese.

A little bird with three legs. According to Lumi, he is God. He explains and reveals various secrets of an alternate world to Youta.

Strongest Archer of the Caesar Kingdom. She appears as a quiet diligent girl. But actually, she is very perverted and for a long time dreams about mating with a man. She is a member of The Quintet group that protects the city of Meese.

The Strider. She is a member of The Quintet group that protects the city of Meese.

The Lancer. She is a member of The Quintet group that protects the city of Meese.

The Guardian. She is a member of The Quintet group that protects the city of Meese.
  
A pair of twins, that appear in the city of Meese. They are brutally honest.

An elf that runs a store where she sell various mysterious goods.

Youta's childhood friend for which he holds deep feelings.

Publication
Parallel Paradise, written and illustrated by Lynn Okamoto, began in Kodansha's seinen manga magazine Weekly Young Magazine on March 18, 2017. In July 2022, it was announced that the manga was nearing its climax. Kodansha has compiled its chapters into individual tankōbon volumes. The first volume was published on August 4, 2017. As of March 6, 2023, twenty volumes have been released.

Seven Seas Entertainment announced the acquisition of the manga in August 2019. It is being released under their Ghost Ship imprint, and the first volume was published on March 31, 2020.

Volume list

Reception
In July 2020, the manga became one of seven titles to be removed from Books Kinokuniya in Australia for claims of promoting child pornography.

References

External links
 

Ecchi anime and manga
Isekai anime and manga
Kodansha manga
Seinen manga
Seven Seas Entertainment titles
Sword and sorcery anime and manga
Witchcraft in anime and manga